For the Record with Greta was an American news television program hosted by Greta Van Susteren, which began airing on MSNBC on January 9, 2017. It was created after she moved from Fox News to MSNBC amidst sexual allegations against Roger Ailes, although she defended him. She has stated she was "troubled by the culture" at Fox News. Van Susteren pitched the show as "fair and balanced." For The Record was cancelled on June 29, 2017 after Van Susteren departed MSNBC. The final episode aired the previous day on June 28, 2017. The program had lower viewership than comparable shows on MSNBC, which likely contributed to the cancellation.

See also 
 On the Record

References

External links
 

2010s American television news shows
2017 American television series debuts
English-language television shows
MSNBC original programming